The Sam Nunn School of International Affairs, at the Georgia Institute of Technology located in Atlanta, Georgia is the only professional school of international affairs at a major technological institution. Founded in 1990, the School was renamed the Sam Nunn School of International Affairs in 1996 in honor of former US Senator and Georgia Tech alumnus Sam Nunn.

The School's programs focus on understanding the global context of advances in science and technology and on preparing students to address concerns at the nexus of science, technology, and international affairs. The Sam Nunn School of International Affairs is a member of The Association of Professional Schools of International Affairs (APSIA), an organization that works to advance international understanding, prosperity, peace and security through professional education in international affairs.

Degree programs
Currently the Sam Nunn School offers three undergraduate degree programs including the B.S. degree in International Affairs, which places emphasis on strategic planning and analysis skills. In partnership with School of Modern Languages and the School of Economics in Georgia Tech’s Ivan Allen College, the Sam Nunn School also offers a B.S. in International Affairs and Modern Language, with concentrations in French, German, Japanese, and Spanish, and the B.S. in International Affairs and Economics. The school offers a master's degree in International Affairs that allows participating students interdisciplinary work in economics, management, public policy, computer science, engineering, and other fields. The school also offers an International Affairs, Science and Technology Doctoral Degree.

Minors and Certificates
International Affairs (Minor)
International Affairs (Certificate)
Asian Affairs (Certificate)
European Affairs (Certificate)
Scenarios, Models and Military Games (Certificate)
Latin American Affairs (Certificate)

Research
The Nunn School's faculty conducts research in a wide range of fields including international political economy, comparative politics, and international security policy. In addition, faculty members possess strong regional expertise in East Asia, Europe, and Latin America. The Nunn School also hosts a variety of programs that allow close interaction with scholars and practitioners of international affairs.

Research Centers, Institutes and Policy Programs
Center for International Strategy, Technology and Policy
Center for European and Transatlantic Studies
Jean Monnet Centre of Excellence
Sam Nunn Security Program
Georgia East Asia Research Schools (GEARS) is a three-university consortium (Emory University, Georgia Institute of Technology, Georgia State University)

Study Abroad Programs
The Sam Nunn School encourages its students to participate in at least one study abroad experience while in the program. The School sponsors summer programs on European economic integration and security institutions in Brussels, Belgium; on China's transition to a market economy in Shanghai, China; on democratization, privatization, and regional economic integration in Buenos Aires, Argentina and Brazil; on the political economy of development in Valencia, Spain; and on environmental politics and development in Costa Rica.

References

External links
Official Site
Association of Professional Schools of International Affairs
News Release: BOR Approves PhD Degree in International Affairs

Georgia Tech colleges and schools
1990 establishments in Georgia (U.S. state)
Schools of international relations in the United States